Maria Barnas (born 28 August 1973, Hoorn) is a Dutch writer, poet and artist.

Awards
 2004 C. Buddingh'-prijs voor nieuwe Nederlandstalige poëzie' for 'Two Suns' ('Twee zonnen, 2003 De Arbeiderspers) 
 2009 J.C. Bloem-poëzieprijs for 'A City Rises' (Er staat een stad op, 2007 De Arbeiderspers)
 2014 Nomination for VSB Poetry Prize for 'Yeah Right The Big Bang' (Jaja de oerknal, 2013 De Arbeiderspers)
 2014 Anna Bijns Poetry Prize for Jaja de oerknal
 2019 Nomination for VSB Poetry Prize for Jaja de oerknal

Works

Novels
 Engelen van (Ice Angels) (1997)
 De baadster (The bather) (2000)
 Altijd Augustus (August Always) (2017)
Poetry
 Twee zonnen (Two Suns) (De Arbeiderspers, 2003) 
 Er staat een stad op (A City Rises), De Arbeiderspers, Amsterdam 2007.
 Jaja de oerknal (Yeah right the Big Bang), De Arbeiderspers, Amsterdam 2013, 
 Nachtboot (Night Boat), Van Oorschot, 2018, nominated for the VSB Poetry Prize 2019

Essays
 Fantastisch (On Fantasy)'', De Arbeiderspers, 2010, collected news paper articles for NRC Handelsblad

References

External links

 Website of her gallery with CV

1973 births
Living people
21st-century Dutch novelists
Dutch women poets
Dutch women novelists
People from Hoorn
21st-century Dutch women artists
21st-century Dutch women writers
21st-century Dutch poets
C. Buddingh' Prize winners